Giorgio is a male Italian given name and sometimes a surname. It is equivalent to the English name George. Notable people with the name include:

Surname
 Eusebio da San Giorgio, Italian painter
 Francesco di Giorgio, Italian painter
 Francesco Giorgio, Italian writer
 Frank Di Giorgio, Canadian city councillor
 Gail Brewer-Giorgio, American author
 Marchesi di San Giorgio, Maltese nobility
 Marosa di Giorgio, Uruguayan writer
 Pietro De Giorgio (born 1983), Italian footballer

Given name
 Giorgio Ordelaffi, Italian nobility
 Giorgio de' Buondelmonti, ruler of Ioannina in 1411

Artists and entertainers
 Carlo Giorgio Garofalo, Italian composer
 Giorgio Amendola, Italian writer
 Giorgio Andreoli, Italian potter
 Giorgio Anselmi, Italian painter
 Giorgio Arlorio, Italian screenwriter and director
 Giorgio Armani, Italian fashion designer
 Giorgio Baffo, Italian poet
 Giorgio Bàrberi Squarotti, Italian literary critic
 Giorgio Bassani, Italian writer
 Giorgio Bianchi, Italian film director
 Giorgio Calabrese, Italian songwriter
 Giorgio Cantarini, Italian actor
 Giorgio Capitani, Italian film director
 Giorgio Cavaglieri, Italian-American painter
 Giorgio Cavazzano, Italian comic strip artist
 Giorgio Colangeli, Italian actor
 Giorgio Chinaglia, Italian soccer player
 Giorgio de Chirico, Italian painter
 Giorgio Duranti, Italian painter
 Giorgio Faletti, Italian writer
 Giorgio Ferrich, Croatian writer
 Giorgio Ferroni, Italian director
 Giorgio Gaber, Italian singer-songwriter
 Giorgio Gandini del Grano, Italian painter
 Giorgio Gaslini, Italian jazz pianist
 Giorgio Federico Ghedini, Italian composer
 Giorgio Ghisi, Italian engraver
 Giorgio Gomelsky, Georgian record producer
 Giorgio Grassi, Italian architect
 Giorgio Locatelli, Italian television chef
 Giorgio Mainerio, Italian composer
 Giorgio Manganelli, Italian writer
 Giorgio Massari, Italian architect
 Giorgio Morandi, Italian painter
 Giorgio Moroder, Italian record producer
 Giorgio Moser, Italian film director and screenwriter
 Giorgio Orsini, Croatian sculptor
 George Ortuzar, Cuban-American television personality (nicknamed "Giorgio" on his show Giorgiomania)
 Giorgio Pacchioni, Italian performer
 Giorgio Pasotti, Italian actor and martial arts athlete
 Giorgio Pastina, Italian screenwriter and film director
 Giorgio Pressburger, Italian writer
 Giorgio Prosperi, Italian screenwriter
 Giorgio Pullicino, Maltese painter and architect
 Giorgio Ronconi, Italian baritone
 Giorgio Sadotti, British conceptual artist
 Giorgio Saviane, Italian writer
 Giorgio Scerbanenco, Italian crime writer
 Giorgio Costantino Schinas, Maltese architect and civil engineer
 Giorgio Sommer, German-Italian  photographer
 Giorgio Strehler, Italian opera director
 Giorgio Tirabassi, Italian actor
 Giorgio Tozzi, American opera singer
 Giorgio A. Tsoukalos, Swiss-born Greek writer
 Giorgio Tuinfort, Suriname-born Dutch music composer and producer
 Giorgio van Straten, Italian writer
 Giorgio Vasari, Italian painter and architect
 Giorgio Zancanaro, Italian baritone
 Pier Giorgio Di Cicco, Italian-Canadian poet

Politicians
 Giorgio Adorno, doge of the Republic of Genoa
 Giorgio Almirante, Italian politician
 Giorgio Borġ Olivier, Maltese politician
 Giorgio Carbone, Italian "head of state" of Seborga
 Giorgio Carollo, Italian politician
 Giorgio de' Buondelmonti, ruler of Epirus
 Giorgio Giudici, Swiss politician
 Giorgio La Malfa, Italian politician
 Giorgio La Pira, Italian politician
 Giorgio Mammoliti, Canadian city councillor
 Giorgio Mitrovich, Maltese politician and activist
 Giorgio Napolitano, Italian president
 Giorgio Orsoni, Italian politician
 Giorgio Ruffolo, Italian economist, journalist and politician 
 Giorgio Sonnino, Italian politician
Giorgio Tonini (born 1959), Italian journalist and politician
 Giorgio Vido, Italian politician

Scientists and philosophers
 Gian Giorgio Trissino, Italian humanist
 Giorgio Abetti, Italian solar astronomer
 Giorgio Agamben, Italian philosopher
 Giorgio Antonucci, Italian physician
 Giorgio Baglivi, Croatian scientist
 Giorgio Biandrata, Italian physician
 Giorgio Buttazzo, Italian engineer
 Giorgio Ceragioli, Italian engineer and peace activist
 Giorgio Colli, Italian philosophy professor
 Giorgio Del Vecchio, Italian legal philosopher
 Giorgio Jan, Italian zoologist
 Giorgio Levi Della Vida, Italian Jewish linguist
 Giorgio Malinverni, Swiss law professor
 Giorgio Nataletti, Italian musicologist
 Giorgio Parisi, Italian theoretical physicist
 Giorgio Pestelli, Italian musicologist
 Giorgio Samorini, Italian ethnobotanist
 Giorgio Sideri, Italian cartographer

Sportsmen
 Giorgio Achterberg, Dutch football player
 Giorgio Alverà, Italian bobsledder
 Giorgio Anglesio, Italian fencer
 Giorgio Avola, Italian fencer
 Giorgio Bassi, Italian race car driver
 Giorgio Belladonna, Italian bridge player
 Giorgio Biasini, Italian bobsledder
 Giorgio Bocchino, Italian fencer
 Giorgio Cagnotto, Italian diver
 Giorgio Cecchinel, Italian cyclist
 Giorgio Chiellini, Italian football player
 Giorgio Chinaglia, Italian football striker
 Giorgio Cornacchia, Italian rugby league footballer
 Giorgio Corona, Italian football player
 Giorgio de Bettin, Italian ice hockey player
 Giorgio Di Centa, Italian cross country skier
 Giorgio Duboin, Italian bridge player
 Giorgio Ferrini, Italian football player
 Giorgio Francia, Italian racing driver
 Giorgio Frezzolini, Italian football player
 Giorgio Frinolli, Italian hurdler
 Giorgio Furlan, Italian cyclist
 Giorgio Galimberti, Italian tennis player
 Giorgio Ghezzi, Italian football player
 Giorgio Gorla, Italian sailor
 Giorgio Lalle, Italian breaststroke swimmer
 Giorgio Lamberti, Italian swimmer
 Giorgio Lucenti, Italian football player
 Giorgio Marras, Italian sprinter
 Giorgio Mazza, Italian hurdler
 Giorgio Mondini, Swiss racing driver
 Giorgio Morini, Italian football player
 Giorgio Oberweger, Italian athlete
 Giorgio Pantano, Italian racing driver
 Giorgio Perondini, Italian swimmer
 Giorgio Pessina, Italian fencer
 Giorgio Petrosyan, Italian kickboxer
 Giorgio Piantella, Italian pole vaulter
 Giorgio Pichler, Italian luger
 Giorgio Puia, Italian football player
 Giorgio Rasulo, English football player
 Giorgio Rocca, Italian alpine skier
 Giorgio Roselli, Italian football player and coach
 Giorgio Rossano, Italian football player
 Giorgio Rubino, Italian race walker
 Giorgio Santelli, Italian fencer
 Giorgio Sbruzzi, Italian canoeist
 Giorgio Scarlatti, Italian racing driver
 Giorgio Schiavini, Italian football player
 Giorgio Sterchele, Italian football player
 Giorgio Tavecchio, Italian born gridiron football player
 Giorgio Treves de'Bonfili, Italian football player
 Giorgio Vanzetta, Italian cross country skier
 Giorgio Venturin, Italian footballer
 Giorgio Zampori, Italian gymnast

Other professions
 Giorgio Basta, Italian general
 Giorgio DeLuca, American entrepreneur
 Giorgio Gusmini, Italian cardinal
 Giorgio Panto, Italian entrepreneur
 Giorgio Perlasca, Italian war hero
 Pier Giorgio Frassati, Italian Roman Catholic social activist, beatified

Fictional characters
 Giorgio Bruno, from the video game Time Crisis 4
 Giorgio Zott, the main antagonist from the video game Time Crisis 3

Places
"San Giorgio" is the Italian for Saint George. Placenames with Giorgio or San Giorgio include:

Municipalities and towns
 Castel Giorgio
 Castel San Giorgio
 Monforte San Giorgio
 Porto San Giorgio
 San Giorgio a Cremano
 San Giorgio Albanese
 San Giorgio a Liri
 San Giorgio Canavese
 San Giorgio della Richinvelda
 San Giorgio delle Pertiche
 San Giorgio del Sannio
 San Giorgio di Lomellina
 San Giorgio di Mantova
 San Giorgio di Nogaro
 San Giorgio di Pesaro
 San Giorgio di Piano
 San Giorgio in Bosco
 San Giorgio Ionico
 San Giorgio La Molara
 San Giorgio Lucano
 San Giorgio Monferrato
 San Giorgio Morgeto
 San Giorgio Piacentino
 San Giorgio Scarampi
 San Giorgio su Legnano
 Torre San Giorgio

Others
 Monte San Giorgio, Swiss mountain
 Palazzo San Giorgio, palace in Genoa
 Pieve di San Giorgio, church in Argenta
 San Giorgio al Palazzo, church in Milan
 San Giorgio in Velabro, church in Rome
 San Giorgio Maggiore, island of Venice
 Church of San Giorgio Maggiore, Palladian church on the island
 San Giorgio Maggiore at dusk, painting by Claude Monet
 San Giorgio Monastery, monastery on the island
 San Giorgio (Siena), church in Siena
 Stadio Giorgio Ascarelli, Italian sports stadium

Other uses
 San Giorgio class, Italian type of amphibious transport dock
 San Giorgio-class cruiser, class of Italian armoured cruisers
 Yes, Giorgio, musical with Luciano Pavarotti

See also
 Di Giorgio (disambiguation)
 San Giorgio (disambiguation)

Italian masculine given names